The Third Antichrist is the third full-length album by the Swedish blackened death metal band Necrophobic. It was recorded and mixed at Sunlight studios in Stockholm, Sweden December 1998 – June 1999, and released by Black Mark Production in October 1999. Jens Ryden and Michael Semprevivo designed the cover.

Track listing
 "Rise of the Infernal" 01:45 (Music: Sebastian Ramstedt)
 "The Third of Arrivals" 04:18 (Music: Tobias Sidegård; Lyrics: Sidegård, Ramstedt)
 "Frozen Empire" 04:35 (Music: Ramstedt, Joakim Sterner; Lyrics: Sterner)
 "Into Armageddon" 04:37 (Music: Martin Halfdan; Lyrics: Sterner)
 "Eye of the Storm" 04:58 (Music: Sidegård, Ramstedt; Lyrics: Sidegård)
 "The Unhallowed" 02:55 (Music: Halfdan; Lyrics: Sterner)
 "Isaz" 03:37 (Music: Ramstedt; Lyrics: Halfdan, Sidegård)
 "The Throne of Souls Possessed" 04:40 (Music: Sterner, Ramstedt; Lyrics: Sterner)
 "He Who Rideth in Rage" 04:12 (Music: Halfdan, Sidegård, Ramstedt; Lyrics: Halfdan)
 "Demonic" 05:13 (Music: Ramstedt, Sterner; Lyrics: Ramstedt)
 "One Last Step Into the Great Mist" 03:30 (Music: Halfdan; Lyrics: Halfdan)

Members
Tobias Sidegård - Vocals and bass guitar
Sebastian Ramstedt - Lead and rhythm guitar
Martin Halfdan - Lead and rhythm guitar
Joakim Sterner - Drums

References

1999 albums
Necrophobic albums